Muhammad Sudomo, better known as Sudomo (20 September 1926 – 18 April 2012) was a high-ranking Indonesian military official who served in a number of positions during the New Order regime of Indonesian president Suharto. He served as Chief of Staff of the Navy from 1969 until 1973, Commander for Security and Order from 1978 until 1983, Minister of Manpower from 1983 until 1988, Coordinating Minister for Political and Security Affairs from 1988 until 1993, and Chairman of the Supreme Advisory Council of the Republic of Indonesia from 1993 until 1998.

References 

1926 births
2012 deaths

Indonesian military personnel